George William (13 November 1595 – 1 December 1640), of the Hohenzollern dynasty, was Margrave and Elector of Brandenburg and Duke of Prussia from 1619 until his death. His reign was marked by ineffective governance during the Thirty Years' War. He was the father of Frederick William, the "Great Elector".

Biography

Born in Cölln on the Spree (today part of Berlin), George William was the son of John Sigismund, Margrave of Brandenburg and Anna of Prussia. His maternal grandfather was Albert Frederick, Duke of Prussia. In 1616, he married Elisabeth Charlotte of the Palatinate. Their only son Frederick William would later be known as the "Great Elector". Of his two daughters, the eldest, Louise Charlotte, married Jacob Kettler, Duke of Courland, and the younger, Hedwig Sophie, married William VI, Landgrave of Hesse-Kassel.

In 1619, George William inherited the Margravate of Brandenburg and the Duchy of Prussia, then part of Poland, although his ownership was not confirmed by Sigismund III Vasa until September 1621. He proved a weak and ineffective ruler in a very difficult period of history; possession of Prussia involved him in the 1621 to 1625 Polish–Swedish War, since Gustavus Adolphus of Sweden was married to his sister Maria Eleonora. 

During the Thirty Years' War, the Calvinist George William tried to remain neutral in the contest between the Catholic Emperor Ferdinand II, and his mostly Lutheran opponents. When the war shifted to northern Germany in 1625, this did not protect his lands from being looted by Imperial troops, and he was forced to take sides when Gustavus intervened in the Empire in 1630. However, this simply replaced one set of plunderers with another; Gustavus could not support so large an army, and his unpaid and unfed troops became increasingly mutinous and ill-disciplined. 

After Gustavus was killed at Lützen in November 1632, George William joined the Swedish-backed Heilbronn League, until defeat at Nördlingen on 6 September 1634. Following the 1635 Peace of Prague, the League was dissolved, although by now Brandenburg's population had been decimated by the war. 

Leaving his Catholic and pro-Imperial chief minister Schwarzenberg to run the government, George William withdrew in 1637 to the relatively untouched region of Prussia, where he lived in retirement until his death at Königsberg in 1640. He was succeeded by his far more accomplished son Frederick William.

Ancestry

References

Sources

External links

[aged 45]

1595 births
1640 deaths
17th-century Dukes of Prussia
People from Berlin
German Calvinist and Reformed Christians
Converts to Calvinism from Lutheranism
Prince-electors of Brandenburg
House of Hohenzollern
16th-century German people
17th-century German people
Dukes of Prussia
Electoral Princes of Brandenburg
German people of the Thirty Years' War